Bryan Ward-Perkins is an archaeologist and historian of the later Roman Empire and early Middle Ages, with a particular focus on the transitional period between those two eras, an historical sub-field also known as Late Antiquity. Ward-Perkins is a fellow and tutor in history at Trinity College, Oxford.

Early life and education
The son of historian John Bryan Ward-Perkins, he was born and raised in Rome and spoke Italian from childhood. He graduated from the  University of Oxford with a Doctor of Philosophy (DPhil) degree in 1980: his doctoral thesis was titled "Urban public building in Italy, north of Salerno 300–850 AD".

Academic interests 

Ward-Perkins' published work has focused primarily on the urban and economic history of the Mediterranean and western Europe during Late Antiquity. His 2005 book, The Fall of Rome and the End of Civilization, included statements addressing what he saw as an over-correction in the approaches of modern historiography to late Roman history. Using primarily archaeological evidence, Ward-Perkins takes issue with what he says is the "fashionable" idea that the western Roman Empire did not actually fall but instead experienced a mostly-benign transformation into the Christian kingdoms of medieval Europe. In his contrasting view, "the coming of the Germanic peoples was very unpleasant for the Roman population, and the long-term effects of the dissolution of the empire were dramatic."

Ward-Perkins' contributions to fourteenth volume of The Cambridge Ancient History were praised by Jan Willem Drijvers and Geoffrey Greatrex, with the latter declaring that Ward-Perkins' chapters on the economy of the late Roman Empire were "among the finest of the volume".

Awards and honours
2006 Hessell-Tiltman Prize, The Fall of Rome and the End of Civilization

Selected works 
1984: From Classical Antiquity to the Middle Ages: urban public building in Northern and Central Italy AD 300-850 . Oxford: Clarendon Press 
1998: "The Cities", in The Cambridge Ancient History, Vol. XIII: 337-425
2000: "Why Did The Anglo-Saxons not Become More British?" (English Historical Review, June 2000)
2001: The Cambridge Ancient History, Vol. XIV: 425-600 (edited with Averil Cameron and Michael Whitby). Cambridge University Press
2005: The Fall of Rome and the End of Civilization. Oxford: Oxford University Press

References

External links 
 Staff profile at University of Oxford History Faculty
 A joint interview with Bryan Ward-Perkins and Peter Heather  at Oxford University Press
 Podcast Bryan Ward-Perkins on the Fall of the Roman Empire
Interview about The Fall of Rome for Historically Speaking. (archived from the original)

English historians
Fellows of Trinity College, Oxford
Living people
Year of birth missing (living people)